The Man Who Had Power Over Women is a 1970 British comedy film directed by John Krish and starring Rod Taylor, Carol White and James Booth. The screenplay concerns a successful Australian talent agent who grows disenchanted with his life, which includes a failing marriage and having to represent a troublesome rock group. Further complicating things, he begins an affair with his best friend's wife.

Production
The original director was Silvio Narizzano who left the project prior to shooting. The screenwriters were Chris Bryant and Allan Scott, who were so upset with subsequent changes made they requested their names be taken off the film.

Cast
 Rod Taylor - Peter Reaney
 Carol White - Jody Pringle
 James Booth - Val Pringle
 Penelope Horner - Angela Reaney
 Charles Korvin - Alfred Felix
 Alexandra Stewart - Frances
 Keith Barron - Jake Braid
 Clive Francis - Barry Black
 Marie-France Boyer - Maggie
 Magali Noël - Mrs Franchetti
 Geraldine Moffat - Lydia Blake
 Wendy Hamilton - Mary Gray
 Ellis Dale - Norman
 Philip Stone - Angela's father
 Matthew Booth - Mark Pringle
 Sara Booth - Sarah Pringle
 Virginia Clay - Mrs Pringle
 Jimmy Jewel - Mr Pringle
 Diana Chance - Stripper
 Patrick Durkin - Herbie
 Paul Farrell - Reaney's father
 Geoffrey Hughes - Policeman
 Valerie Leon - Glenda
 Ruth Trouncer - Mrs Gray
 Jacki Piper - Receptionist

References

External links

1970 films
1970 comedy films
British comedy films
Films scored by Johnny Mandel
Films directed by John Krish
Embassy Pictures films
1970s English-language films
1970s British films